Székely is a village in Szabolcs-Szatmár-Bereg county, in the Northern Great Plain region of eastern Hungary.

Geography

References

External links
Aerial photographs of Székely

Populated places in Szabolcs-Szatmár-Bereg County